The 1962 Copa de Campeones Finals was the final series of the 1962 staging of South American football's premier club competition, the Copa de Campeones, better known today as the Copa Libertadores. The showpiece event was contested between defending champions Peñarol and Santos. Two-time winners Peñarol were appearing in their third consecutive final, whereas Santos were seeking to win the competition for the first time. Ten teams entered the competition in its third season and, due to the rules in place at the time, Peñarol received a bye into the semifinals and reached the final having won only one match in the semifinal round.

In the semi-finals, Peñarol drew 2-2 on points with classic rivals Nacional after they each won a match. A playoff was contested in order to break the tie; the match ended in a draw and Peñarol went through due to their better total goal difference. Santos breezed past the first round winning three of their matches and drawing once, while scoring an astonishing twenty goals and conceding six. The team contained incredible figures such as the fabulous Coutinho, the legendary Pelé and the great Pepe, among others. In the semifinals, the ballet blanco dispatched Universidad Católica to earn a slot in the finals. Santos would go on to dethrone Peñarol after winning the playoff 3-0 to win the coveted throphy and become the second champions of this prestigious event.

Qualified teams

Venues

Rules
The finals were played over two legs; home and away. The team that accumulated the most points —two for a win, one for a draw, zero for a loss— after the two legs would be crowned champion. Unlike the previous two editions however, should the two teams be tied on points after the second leg a playoff was at a neutral venue would become the next tie-breaker. Goal difference was going to be used as a last resort.

Match details

First leg

|  style="vertical-align:top; width:50%;"|

|}

Second leg

|  style="vertical-align:top; width:50%;"|

|}

Playoff

|  style="vertical-align:top; width:50%;"|

|}

References

External links
CONMEBOL's official website 
Peñarol in Copa Libertadores 1960-1969

1
1962
Peñarol matches
Santos FC matches
1962 in Uruguayan football
1962 in Brazilian football
1962